Naked Paradise (sometimes credited as Thunder Over Hawaii) is a 1957 drama film directed by Roger Corman. It stars Richard Denning and Beverly Garland.

Corman later asked Charles Griffith, who worked on the script, to reuse his screenplay for Atlas (1960), Beast from Haunted Cave (1960) and Creature from the Haunted Sea (1961).

Plot
Duke Bradley's boat is hired to sail a group to the Hawaiian Islands. His passengers include Zac Cotton, alcoholic girlfriend Max McKenzie and a pair of thugs, Mitch and Stony, who following a lūʻau, without Duke's knowledge, rob a plantation of its payroll.

The gang intends to continue on to another island in the South Pacific, but tempers flare after Max is struck by Zac, which causes Duke to quit, demanding payment. As he is about to set sail, Max asks to go with him, determined to change her life. A hurricane hits, however, forcing Duke to turn back. On arrival, he is beaten unconscious by Mitch and Stony while the woman is roughed up by Zac.

Zac intends to make off with Duke's schooner and takes a local girl, Lanai, as a hostage, shooting Stony, who objects to this. A fight ensues in which Duke triumphs after Zac is killed by the boat's propeller. Duke and Max sail away.

Cast
 Beverly Garland as Max
 Richard Denning as Duke
 Dick Miller as Mitch
 Jonathan Haze as Stony
 Leslie Bradley as Zac
 Lisa Montell as Lanai

Production

In early July 1956 it was announced Beverly Garland would star in Naked Paradise by R. Wright Campbell directed by Roger Corman. Garland had made several films for Corman, including Not of This Earth, It Conquered the World, and Gunslinger. A few days later it was announced John Ireland, who had just made Gunslinger for Corman under a two-picture deal, would be Garland's costar. Filming was to begin on September 12.

In August it was announced the film would star Lisa Montell, who had been in Shark Reef. Ireland was still attached at this stage. He was soon replaced by Richard Denning.

Robert Wright Campbell's script was rewritten by Charles B. Griffith.

Filming started 2 September 1956. The film was shot in two weeks on location in Hawaii, back-to-back with She Gods of Shark Reef.

Samuel Arkoff of AIP has a small role in the movie. Arkoff later recalled:
We went over to Hawaii — me, my two kids and my wife, Jim Nicholson with his wife and three kids. Roger told me to come over to where he was shooting, and he gave me this one line to read to Richard Denning: “It’s been a good harvest, and the money is in the safe.” Now that's a key line (laughs)! That was my first and last role; I’ve never been asked back into any of ’em since! 
The Cocoa Palms Hotel received an on screen credit in exchange for housing the films stars at a reduced rate.

Garland recalled "We filmed on the island of Kauai, stayed at the Coca Palms Hotel and had great accommodations. Roger really did this one up the right way. I don't know if it was because we were at this beautiful location and Roger simply felt like spending more, but it was one of the best locations ever, especially for a Roger Corman film." However it would be the last film Garland made for the director.

Release
The film was initially released as a double feature with Flesh and the Spur It was re-released in 1960 under the title Thunder over Hawaii.

Reception
Variety found the film colorful, with interesting action and a well-knit story.

Monthly Film Bulletin found the picture beautifully shot but average in other facets.

The Los Angeles Times said "some beautiful Hawaiian scenery, an excellent performance by Richard Denning... and a very believable characterisation by Beverly Garland make the picture quite tolerable."

Notes

External links

Review of film at Variety

1957 films
1950s adventure drama films
American black-and-white films
1950s English-language films
Films directed by Roger Corman
Films set in Hawaii
Films shot in Hawaii
American International Pictures films
American adventure drama films
Films produced by Roger Corman
Films with screenplays by Charles B. Griffith
Films with screenplays by Robert Wright Campbell
Films scored by Ronald Stein
1957 drama films
1950s American films